Albert Johnson (7 September 1923 – December 1989) was an English professional footballer who played as a full back.

Career
Born in Morpeth, Johnson signed for Bradford City in January 1947 from Ashington, leaving the club in 1950 to sign for Kettering Town. During his time with Bradford City he made 35 appearances in the Football League.

Sources

References

1923 births
1989 deaths
English footballers
Ashington A.F.C. players
Bradford City A.F.C. players
Kettering Town F.C. players
English Football League players
Association football fullbacks